The 1942 Campeonato Nacional de Fútbol Profesional was Chilean first tier’s 10th season. Santiago Morning was the tournament’s champion, winning its first title.

Scores

Standings

Topscorer

References

External links
ANFP 
RSSSF Chile 1942

Primera División de Chile seasons
Primera
Chile